Bess Lomax Hawes (January 21, 1921 – November 27, 2009) was an American folk musician, folklorist, and researcher. She was the daughter of John Avery Lomax and Bess Bauman-Brown Lomax, and the sister of Alan Lomax and John Lomax Jr.

Early life and education

Born in Austin, Texas, Bess grew up learning folk music from a very early age, since her father, a former English professor and twice president of the American Folklore Society, was Honorary Curator of American folk song at the Library of Congress from 1935 to 1948. As a child, she excelled at classical piano, under the tutelage of her mother, and later she learned to play the guitar.

She entered the University of Texas at fifteen and the following year assisted her father, John A.; her brother, Alan Lomax; and modernist composer Ruth Crawford Seeger with their book,  Our Singing Country (1941). She graduated from Bryn Mawr College near Philadelphia with a degree in sociology. Later, in the 1960s, she was among the first group of students to receive an M.A. in folklore at the University of California at Berkeley, under the guidance of professor Alan Dundes.

Career in music and folk arts

In the early 1940s she moved to New York City, where she was active on the folk scene. She was an on-and-off member of the Almanac Singers; she and a fellow Almanac singer, Baldwin "Butch" Hawes, an artist, were married in 1943. Another Almanac member, Woody Guthrie, taught her mandolin.

During World War II Bess Lomax Hawes worked for the Office of War Information preparing radio broadcasts for troops overseas. After the end of the war, she and her family moved to Boston; while there she wrote songs for Walter A. O'Brien's 1949 mayoral campaign including "M.T.A.," co-written with Jacqueline Steiner. The song became a hit for the Kingston Trio in 1959. While her children (Nicholas Hawes, Corey Hawes Denos, and Naomi Hawes Bishop) were attending a cooperative nursery school organized by graduate students at MIT and Harvard:

In the 1950s she moved to California, where she taught guitar, banjo, mandolin and folk singing through UCLA Extension courses, at the Idyllwild summer arts program and, starting in 1963, at San Fernando Valley State College. She also played at local clubs as well as at some of the larger folk festivals such as the Newport Folk Festival and the Berkeley Folk Festival.

In 1968 she became associate professor of Anthropology at San Fernando Valley State College and later head of the Anthropology Department at what is now Cal State Northridge. Her husband, Butch Hawes, died in 1971.

In 1975, Hawes accepted a position in administration at the Smithsonian Institution, where she was instrumental in organizing the Smithsonian's 1976 Bicentennial Festival of Traditional Folk Arts on the National Mall. In 1977, she was named first director of the Folk and Traditional Arts Program at the National Endowment for the Arts, and created the National Heritage Fellowships, which recognize traditional artists and performers. During her tenure, funding for folks arts rose from about $100,000 to $4 million, and 50 state or territorial folk arts programs were set up:

She retired in 1992.

Bess Lomax Hawes was the recipient of an honorary doctorate from the University of North Carolina and the National Medal of Arts awarded in 1993 by President Bill Clinton. An NEA traditional arts award is named in her honor.

Her memoir, Sing It Pretty, was published by Illinois University Press in 2008.

Death and legacy

While a faculty member at California State University Northridge, Hawes compiled an extensive archive of folk songs that were gathered by her students in Los Angeles and abroad. The archive is held in the Special Collections and Archives section of CSUN's University Library.

She died in November 2009, aged 88, following a stroke in Portland, Oregon.

Bibliography
Hawes, Bess Lomax. Step it Down: Games, Plays, Songs, and Stories from the Afro-American Heritage. University of Georgia Press, 1987.
Hawes, Bess Lomax, Alan Lomax and J.D. Elder. There's a Brown Girl in the Ring, Random House, New York, 1997 (Cloth). Children's games from the Caribbean.
Hawes, Bess Lomax. Sing It Pretty: A Memoir (Music in American Life). University of Illinois Press. 2008.

Filmography
 The Films of Bess Lomax Hawes Four films made at San Fernando Valley State (1964–1970) (afterwards California State University Northridge): Georgia Sea Island Singers, Buckdancer, Pizza Pizza Daddy-O, and Say Old Man Can You Play the Fiddle.

Notes

External links
 Bess Lomax Hawes. Smithsonian Folklife Center.
 Dreier, Peter. "Remembering Bess Lomax Hawes". Huffington Post, November 30, 2009.
 Dreier, Peter, and Jim Vrabel. "Banned in Red Scare Boston: The Forgotten Story of Charlie & the MTA". Dissent, Spring, 2008.
 Dreier, Peter, and Jim Vrabel. "Will Charlie Ever Get Off That Train? The true story of the Ballad of the MTA". Huffington Post, February 15, 2009.
[ Bess Lomax Hawes] at Allmusic

1921 births
2009 deaths
American folk musicians
American folklorists
Women folklorists
Musicians from Austin, Texas
Bryn Mawr College alumni
California State University, Northridge faculty
20th-century American musicians
Lomax family
People of the United States Office of War Information
American women civilians in World War II